We Will Eat Well is a South Korean television program. It was transformed into a food talk show, rather than its initial concept of a girl group "muk-bang" competition (eating broadcast).

Hosts/MCs
 Moon Hee-joon (–)
 Jo Se-ho (–)
 Yang Se-hyung (–)

Controversy
Girls Who Eat Well originally was a "muk-bang" show in which members of different girl groups would compete by eating a variety of foods in order to earn the title of the best girl group eater. The format was criticized by viewers uncomfortable watching girl group members be judged on their eating. The show aired two episodes before it was renamed to We Will Eat Well and became a food talk show.

List of episodes

Girls Who Eat Well

We Will Eat Well

References

External links
 
 Girls Who Eat Well

2016 South Korean television series debuts
Korean-language television shows